Porongo is a village located in Andrés Ibáñez Province in Santa Cruz Department, Bolivia.

Population

References

Populated places in Santa Cruz Department (Bolivia)